The Chosen One may refer to:

 The Chosen One (trope), a narrative trope

People
 Adam, "The Chosen One", the first man in the Bible or First man in the Qur'an nicknamed Adam-I-Safi
 LeBron James, American basketball player nicknamed "The Chosen One"
 Jeff Jarrett, American wrestler nicknamed "The Chosen One"
 Jesus, often referred to as "The Chosen One" (see names and titles of Jesus in the New Testament)
 Drew McIntyre, Scottish wrestler nicknamed "The Chosen One"
 David Moyes, Scottish football manager nicknamed "The Chosen One"
 Mustafa, Arabic for "the Chosen One", an epithet of Muhammad
 Josh Rosen, American football quarterback nicknamed "the Chosen One"
 Tyron Woodley, American mixed martial artist
 Donald Trump, 45th US President (called himself this on August 21, 2019)

Arts, entertainment, and media

Fictional entities
 Anakin Skywalker, the one who was destined to bring balance to the Force in Star Wars
 Sal-Afsan, the Chosen One as prophesied by Lubal in the Quintaglio Ascension Trilogy
 Ash Ketchum, protagonist of Pokémon: The Movie 2000
 Buffy Summers, referred to as 'the chosen one' in the series Buffy the Vampire Slayer
 Chandler Jarrell, the hero in The Golden Child, a 1986 film starring Eddie Murphy
 Chosen One (Star Wars), a prophecy-related concept in Star Wars
 Gabriel Belmont, main character in Castlevania: Lords of Shadow and its sequels
 Gohan (Dragon Ball), character from Dragon Ball Z referred to as the Chosen One during his fight with Cell
 Harry Potter (character), lead character in the Harry Potter series
 Homer Simpson, character from The Simpsons who is referred to as "The Chosen One" by the Stonecutters in the sixth-season episode "Homer the Great"
 Neo, character in The Matrix franchise
 Nina Martin, lead character in seasons one and two of the TV series, House of Anubis
 Perry, a fictional character in The Brothers Grunt
 Sgt. Alex Lannon, lead character in Dominion
 Slayer (Buffy the Vampire Slayer), a young female bestowed with mystical powers in the fight against forces of darkness
 The Chosen One, character in Kung Pow! Enter the Fist
 The Chosen One, player character in the  Fallout 2 video game
 The Chosen One, a character in the Animator Vs. Animation series created and animated by Alan Becker
 Vladimir Dracula, lead character of the TV series, Young Dracula

Films
 The Chosen One (1990 film), an Indian film directed by Aribam Syam Sharma
 The Chosen One (2007 film), an animated film
 The Chosen One (2010 film), a film starring Rob Schneider
 The Chosen One: Legend of the Raven, a 1998 film starring Carmen Electra
 The Chosen Ones (1964 film), a Spanish film directed by Tulio Demicheli
 The Chosen Ones (2014 Film) (aka Die Auserwählten), a 2014 film directed by Christoph Röhl
 The Chosen Ones (2015 film), a Mexican film

Literature
The Chosen One (novel), a 2009 teen novel by Carol Lynch Williams
The Chosen One, a 2010 novel by Sam Bourne
Chosen Ones, a 2020 novel by Veronica Roth

Music

Albums
 Chosen One (Hillsong album), 1996
 Chosen One (Olu Maintain album), 2014
 Chosen Ones, a live album by Christian parody band ApologetiX (2007)
 The Chosen One (album), by Hipnosis (2004)
 The Chosen Ones (Stratovarius album), 1999
 The Chosen Ones – Greatest Hits an album by Black Sorrows (1993)

Songs
 "Chosen One" (Smog song), 1993
 "The Chosen One", a song by The Darkest of the Hillside Thickets from the album Spaceship Zero, 2000
 "Chosen One" (The Concretes song), 2006
 "The Chosen One", a song by The B-52's for the soundtrack to Pokémon: The Movie 2000
 "The Chosen One", a song by Borealis from the album Purgatory (2015)
 "The Chosen One", a song by Bread from the album Lost Without Your Love (1977)
 "The Chosen One", a song by Maher Zain from the album Thank You Allah (2009)
 "The Chosen One", the opening theme of American Dragon: Jake Long
 "The Chosen Ones" (song), by Black Sorrows (1988)
 "The Chosen One", a song by Bryan Ferry from the album Boys and Girls (album) (1985)

Television
 The Chosen One (2019 series), a Brazilian web television series 
 Sugo (English: 'The Chosen One'), Philippine fantasy drama television series

See also 
Chosen Few (disambiguation)
Messiah
The Anointed One (disambiguation)
The One (disambiguation)
The Chosen People

References